Rajwapur is a village in Gonda district, Uttar Pradesh.

Geography
Rajwapur village comes under Colonelganj  and Block Haldharmau in Gonda district. It is at a 5 km distance from Colonelganj on Behraich road.
It has an average elevation of 119 metres (390 feet).
It has a very natural environment with a river Saryu flowing near some distance.

Literacy
Literacy rate is moderate. There is a Primary school in the village and the children either have to go to some local private schools or to schools of the other villages. There are very few boys who are even class X passed.

Activities
Mostly the people are farmers and labourers.

References

External links 
 

Villages in Gonda district